Phiala pseudatomaria is a moth in the family Eupterotidae. It was described by Strand in 1911. It is found in Cameroon, the Central African Republic, the Democratic Republic of Congo (Orientale), Mozambique, South Africa, Tanzania and Zimbabwe.

References

Moths described in 1911
Eupterotinae